The ensatina (Ensatina eschscholtzii) is a species complex of plethodontid (lungless) salamanders found in coniferous forests, oak woodland and chaparral from British Columbia, through Washington, Oregon, across California (where all seven subspecies variations are located), all the way down to Baja California in Mexico. The genus Ensatina originated approximately 21.5 million years ago. It is usually considered as monospecific, being represented by a single species, Ensatina eschscholtzii, with several subspecies forming a ring species.

Habitat and description

The ensatina subspecies E. e. eschscholtzii, or Monterey ensatina, can be found in Santa Cruz, Monterey, and the California coastal mountains. They reach a total length of three to five inches, and can be identified primarily by the structure of the tail, and how it is narrower at the base. This salamander is the only type that has this tail structure and five toes on the back feet.

Males often have longer tails than the females, and many of the salamanders have lighter colored limbs in comparison to the rest of the body. The salamanders lay their eggs underground, often in threes, which then hatch directly into salamanders, skipping the usual aquatic phase.

As a ring species
Ensatina eschscholtzii has been described as a ring species in the mountains surrounding the Californian Central Valley. The complex forms a horseshoe shape around the mountains, and though interbreeding can happen between each of the 19 populations around the horseshoe, the Ensatina eschscholtzii subspecies on the western end of the horseshoe cannot interbreed with the Ensatina klauberi on the eastern end. As such, it is thought to be an example of incipient speciation, and provides an illustration of "nearly all stages in a speciation process" (Dobzhansky, 1958). Richard Highton argued that Ensatina is a case of multiple species and not a continuum of one species (meaning, by traditional definitions, it is not a ring species).

Human contact
The ensatina can usually be found under logs or brush, by or in streams and lakes, and in other moist places. They are easily distressed by improper handling, because they rely on cutaneous respiration, their thin skin is very sensitive to heating, drying and exposure to chemicals from warm hands. They may exude a sticky milky secretion from the tail

Subspecies

Yellow-blotched ensatina — E. e. croceater (Cope, 1868)
Monterey ensatina — E. e. eschscholtzii Gray, 1850
Large-blotched ensatina — E. e. klauberi Dunn, 1929
Oregon ensatina — E. e. oregonensis (Girard, 1856)
Painted ensatina — E. e. picta Wood, 1940
Sierra Nevada ensatina — E. e. platensis (Jiménez de la Espada, 1875)
Yellow-eyed ensatina — E. e. xanthoptica Stebbins, 1949

References

External links

 Ensatina Salamander page at Santa Rosa Junior College Department of Life Sciences
 Ensatina Salamander page at AmphibiaWeb

Plethodontidae
Monotypic amphibian genera
Amphibians of North America
Taxa named by John Edward Gray